Classic Reruns TV is an American broadcast and digital television network. It was founded in 2020.

History and description 
Classic Reruns TV features legendary American TV shows from the 1950s to 1970s including The Patty Duke Show, The Beverly Hillbillies, Ozzie & Harriet, Dragnet and Bonanza. It was founded in 2020 as a Roku video on demand channel and then in 2021 as a 24/7 over the air channel. Classic Reruns TV also airs original programming like Butch Patrick's Halloween Monster Bash, featuring the former co-star of TV series The Munsters and airs every Halloween.

See also
 :Category:Classic Reruns TV affiliates

References

External links
 

Television channels and stations established in 2020
Classic television networks
Nostalgia television in the United States
2020 establishments in the United States